McEvilly is a surname. Notable people with the surname include:

Bridget McEvilly (born 1946), English nurse and nursing administrator
John McEvilly (1818–1902), Irish Roman Catholic archbishop
Lee McEvilly (born 1982), English footballer